Angeline Flor Pua (born 17 April 1995) is a Belgian model and beauty pageant titleholder who was crowned Miss Belgium 2018. As Miss Belgium, she represented Belgium at Miss World 2018 and Miss Universe 2019.

Life and career

Early life
Flor Pua was born in Antwerp on 17 April 1995. Her father is a Chinese-Filipino while her mother is Filipino and works in an ironing shop.

Pageantry
In 2016, she was crowned Miss Philippines Europe 2016. Later, she was crowned Miss Antwerp 2018 on 17 September 2017 in De Panne. As Miss Antwerp, she earned the right to compete at Miss Belgium 2018. She went on to be crowned Miss Belgium 2018, and  represented Belgium in the Miss World 2018 competition. She placed in the Top 30.

After Elena Castro Suarez chose to compete at Miss World 2019, Angeline represented Belgium at the Miss Universe 2019 competition where she was unplaced.

References

External links

1995 births
Belgian beauty pageant winners
Belgian people of Filipino descent
Belgian people of Chinese descent
Living people
Miss Belgium winners
Miss Universe 2019 contestants
Miss World 2018 delegates
Models from Antwerp